Eslamabad (also Romanized as Eslāmābād) is a village in Korbal Rural District, in the Central District of Kharameh County, Fars Province, Iran. At the 2006 census, its population was 516, in 125 families.

References 

Populated places in Kharameh County